Khojavend or Xocavənd  or Khodjavend may refer to:
 Khojavend District, Azerbaijan
 Khojavend (town), Azerbaijan
 Xocavənd, Aghjabadi, Azerbaijan